The Biosafety Level 4 Zoonotic Laboratory Network is an international consortium of Biosafety Level 4 research laboratories. Its members are
 National Centre for Foreign Animal Disease (Canada)
 National Bio and Agro-Defense Facility (United States)
 Pirbright Institute (United Kingdom)
 Friedrich Loeffler Institute (Germany)
 CSIRO Australian Animal Health Laboratory (Australia)

References

Biosafety level 4 laboratories
Veterinary research institutes